The 2019 Kazakhstan Premier League was the 28th season of the Kazakhstan Premier League, the highest football league competition in Kazakhstan. FC Astana defended their title, winning the championship for the sixth season in a row, whilst FC Atyrau and FC Aktobe were relegated and FC Taraz survived a relegation playoff against FC Akzhayik.

Teams
FC Kyzylzhar and FC Akzhayik were relegated at the end of the 2018 season, and were replaced by FC Okzhetpes and FC Taraz.

Team overview

Personnel and kits

Note: Flags indicate national team as has been defined under FIFA eligibility rules. Players and Managers may hold more than one non-FIFA nationality.

Foreign players
The number of foreign players is restricted to eight per KPL team. A team can use only five foreign players on the field in each game.

In bold: Players that have been capped for their national team.

Managerial changes

Regular season

Table

Results

Games 1–22

Games 23–33

Relegation play-offs

Statistics

Scoring
 First goal of the season: Ablaykhan Makhambetov for Zhetysu against Okzhetpes (9 March 2019)

Top scorers

Clean sheets
Updated to matches played on 10 November 2019.

References

External links
Official website 

Kazakhstan Premier League seasons
1
Kazakh
Kazakh